Yi Ui-bang (1121 – 12 January 1175) was a military ruler of Korea during the Goryeo period. He was one of many military dictators of Goryeo in the aftermath of the 1170 warrior rebellion.

Life

Background
Yi originated from the Jeonju Yi clan (전주이씨; 全州李氏). He subsequently joined the military and rose in ranks, becoming a minister in the scholar dominated government.

Rebellion
In August 1170 (Uijong 24th year), he joined the Goryeo warrior rebellion, which occurred in defiance against the typically minister ruled Korea. Primary leaders of this rebellion was Jeong Jung-bu and Yi Go who found that warrior-class treatment was truly unfair and planned a coup e tat to establish a warrior government.

The King of Goryeo, Uijong was soon disposed and the new warrior-class ministers set up a puppet king Myeongjong. Yi was named as one of the key figures in the new regime with the title of High Merit Minister (壁上功臣) and given special privileges along with the other ministers. When Yi Go tried to plot a coup and get hold of a dictatorship in 1171, Yi, under the orders of Chung Jung-bu purged and murdered Yi Go.

Governance
With Jeong, Yi increased the size and power of the military and attracted military-class administrators to the regime and appointed these men to national offices which were previously reserved for scholar-class ministers. In 1173, when a scholar-class minister Kim Bo-dang (김보당 金甫當) attempted to restore disposed king Uijong to the throne, Yi decisively slew the former king, preventing any further restoration attempts. With this merit, he was further promoted to Commander of Land Troops.

During his co-governance with Jeong, Yi also faced a series of Buddhist Monk uprisings from different shrines around the nation. As Goryeo was officially a Buddhist nation since Wang Geon's unification of Korea, the Buddhists had great influence upon the government and most Goryeo kings appointed official Buddhist Great Monk advisors to assist in national administration. Due to the increasing Buddhist uprisings, Yi himself commanded his forces to put down these rebellions and raid Buddhist shrines. With his powerful forces, he swept the nation and raided and pillaged these shrines. 

At this time, Jo Wi-chong (조위총, 趙位寵), a general of the North-Western border attempted to start a rebellion. Yi responded by murdering favorers of this rebellion such as Yun In-mi (윤인미, 尹仁美), who was of Seogyung birth. Due to this action, Yi lost support and favors from the people, and when he attempted to put down this rebellion, he failed.

Downfall and death
Yi, attempting to put down Jeong and gain more power, tried to appoint his daughter as Royal Princess consort, an action which did not fulfill objective but instead further endangered Yi's political situation. Due to this action, the 2nd Jo Invasion force, led by Jeong Jung-bu's son Jeong Gyun subsequently murdered Yi Ui-Bang and his supporters and removed his daughter from the royal family. However, soon enough, Jeong Jung-bu was also murdered and the young and righteous dictator Gyeong Dae-seung took power.

Evaluation
General Yi Ui-bang's main legacy remains in the balance that was achieved through the purging of scholars during his co-governance with Jeong. Before the arrival of Yi, the scholar class had more influence in the government to the extent that the warrior-class was greatly mistreated. With the changing of kings and shifting of power from scholar-class to warrior-class, Goryeo faced a new era. A final and very important legacy is his connection with the founder of the Joseon Dynasty, Yi Songgye. Yi Ui-Bang's younger brother Yi In was a 6th generation ancestor of Yi Songgye, thus connecting Yi Ui-Bang and Yi Songgye together.

Family
Father: Yi Yong-bu (이용부, 李勇夫)
Grandfather: Yi Gung-jin (이궁진, 李宮進)
Mother: Lady Yi (이씨, 李氏)
Grandfather: Yi-Hyeong (이형, 李珩)
Brother(s):
Older brother: Yi Jun-ui (이준의, 李俊儀; d. 1174)
Younger brother: Yi Rin (이린, 李隣)
Younger brother: Yi Geo (이거, 李琚)
Wife: Lady Jo (부인 조씨, 夫人 曺氏)
Daughter: Queen Sapyeong (사평왕후, 思平王后; d. 1174)
Son-in-law: Gangjong of Goryeo (고려 강종[康宗]; 1152 – 1213)
Granddaughter: Princess Suryeong (수령궁주, 壽寧宮主; b. 1174)

Popular culture
 Portrayed by Seo In-seok in the 2003-2004 KBS TV series Age of Warriors.

References
http://mtcha.com.ne.kr/koreaman/goryo/man93-iyibang.htm (차석찬의 역사창고)
http://enc.daum.net/dic100/viewContents.do?&m=all&articleID=b18a0210a 
http://www.encyber.com/biodic/contents_n.php?cd=1602&p=4&masterno=127558&haksupno=1742 
http://kr.dic.yahoo.com/search/enc/result.html?pk=17174900

See also
History of Korea
List of Goryeo people

1121 births
1175 deaths
12th-century Korean people
Korean generals
Regents of Korea
Male murder victims
People from Jeonju
Leaders who took power by coup
Leaders ousted by a coup
Jeonju Yi clan